Real Sociedad Femenino is the women's football section of Real Sociedad de Fútbol currently playing in Spain's top league Liga F.

History
Founded on 19 September 2004, Real Sociedad reached the first division after two promotions in its two first seasons ever, and occupying the place of dissolved Estudiantes de Huelva.

After a ninth position in their first season, the club quickly consolidated in the top flight. In 2011, Real Sociedad reached the semifinals of the Copa de la Reina for the first time.

In February 2019, a Basque derby league fixture hosted by Real Sociedad against Athletic Bilbao, which would usually be held at the club's Zubieta training centre, was played at the Anoeta Stadium, attracting an attendance of 21,234 (the result was a 2–2 draw). The following week, the same venue hosted a semi-final of the Copa de la Reina in which Real defeated Sevilla 3–1 in front of 18,731 fans to reach the final of the competition for the first time. On 11 May 2019, the club achieved their first ever major trophy by beating Atlético Madrid 2–1 in the final of the Copa de la Reina, played in Granada. The win granted entry to the newly-established Supercopa de España Femenina, but after overcoming Levante to reach its final, they suffered a humiliating 1–10 defeat to Barcelona.

Reserves
The club's B-team, established in 2018, plays in the  Primera Nacional (3rd level) having gained promotion from the Gipuzkoa provincial league in their first year of operation and from the Basque regional league a year later. A C-team was launched in 2021.

Current squad
As of 18 December 2022

Titles

Official
 Copa de la Reina: 2019
 Euskal Herria Cup: 2012, 2019, 2020,2022

Invitational
 Sport Mundi Tournament: 2005, 2008

Season by season

See also
 Women's Basque derby

References

External links
 Official website
 UEFA profile
Real Sociedad at Txapeldunak

Women's football clubs in Spain
Real Sociedad
2004 establishments in Spain
Primera División (women) clubs
Football clubs in the Basque Country (autonomous community)